The Islamic Azad University, Komijan Branch (Persian: دانشگاه آزاد اسلامی کمیجان, Dāneshgāh-e Āzād-e Eslāmi Komijan) is a branch of Islamic Azad University. The university was established in Komijan, Iran, in 2003 with 500 students and seven fields of study. The university now consists of 11 faculties, one high college, one technical college, one educational center and three research centers. In 2011, about 3,000 students enrolled.

Academic Disciplines

Buildings 

 Management Building
 Technical and Engineering Building
 Agricultural Building
 Rights Building

See also 

 Higher education in Iran
 List of universities in Iran
 Islamic Azad University

References 

Komijan, Islamic Azad University of

Buildings and structures in Markazi Province
Education in Markazi Province